Big Chicken Shaq is an American reality series that premiered on October 6, 2018, on Facebook Watch.

Premise
Big Chicken Shaq follows Shaquille O'Neal's "journey as he angles to balance his already busy life with the restaurant ["Big Chicken" in Las Vegas, NV] – determined to maintain his singular humor in the process."

Production
On July 25, 2018, it was announced that Facebook had given the production a series order for a first season consisting of eight episodes. Executive producers were set to include Steven Michaels, Jonathan Koch, Ryann Lauckner, James Macnab, Mark Efman, Shaquille O’Neal, Perry Rogers, Colin Smeeton, and Mike Parris. Production companies involved in the series were slated to consist of Asylum Entertainment. On September 27, 2018, it was reported that the series would premiere its first two episodes on October 6, 2018.

Episodes

See also
 List of original programs distributed by Facebook Watch

References

External links

2010s American reality television series
American non-fiction web series
English-language television shows
Facebook Watch original programming
2018 American television series debuts
2018 American television series endings